Skyhawk is a Screamin' Swing built by S&S Worldwide at Cedar Point in Sandusky, Ohio. It is located in Frontiertown, next to Snake River Falls. It opened on May 6, 2006, the beginning of Cedar Point's 137th season. A similar ride, Xtreme Swing, opened at Valleyfair the same year.

Specifications

Skyhawk is a Screamin' Swing type ride built by S&S Worldwide. The ride lasts about one minute, and can accommodate 800 passengers per hour. Riders must be  or taller. Riders are restrained by a lap bar.

Incidents
On July 26, 2014, a cable supporting one of the carriages on the pendulum came loose, injuring two guests. One guest was treated on the scene, while the other was taken to a hospital and released.  Skyhawk reopened on August 1, 2014.

References

External links

 Official Skyhawk page
 Skyhawk Photo Gallery at The Point Online

Pendulum rides
Amusement rides manufactured by S&S – Sansei Technologies
Cedar Point
Amusement rides introduced in 2006
Cedar Fair attractions
2006 establishments in Ohio